The Yakovlev Yak-5 was an experimental trainer aircraft designed by Yakovlev OKB in the Soviet Union, and first flown in 1944.

Development and design
In 1944, the Yakovlev UT-2 was the standard primary trainer of the Soviet Air Forces, but its simplicity caused problems when pilots moved on to more sophisticated aircraft, so the Yakovlev design bureau designed a more sophisticated derivative, the UT-2L, which featured an enclosed tandem cockpit, the addition of flaps and blind flying instruments.

At the same time, Yakovlev designed a single-seat aircraft based on the UT-2L, intended as a fighter-trainer. This aircraft, the Yak-5, was a low-wing monoplane of wooden construction, but unlike the UT-2, had the front cockpit removed and an enclosed sliding canopy placed over the rear cockpit. A retractable tailwheel undercarriage replaced the fixed landing gear of the UT-2. It was powered by a Shvetsov M-11D five-cylinder radial producing 115 hp (86 kW), which drove a two-bladed variable-pitch propeller. It could be fitted with a single synchronized ShKAS machine gun aimed by a reflector sight, while the aircraft was also fitted with a radio.

Operational history
The prototype Yak-5 first flew on 7 September 1944. The new fighter-trainer's handling proved popular with its test pilots, and the aircraft successfully passed official evaluation. In the end, neither the UT-2L or the Yak-5 entered production because the Soviet Air Force command believed wooden aircraft were becoming obsolete, which would result in production of the all-metal Yakovlev Yak-18 trainer in late 1945. The sole Yak-5 was destroyed when it suffered failure of the wooden wing during a snap roll and crashed.

Specifications (Yak-5)

References

Notes

Sources
 Gordon, Yefim, Dmitry Komissarov and Sergey Komissarov. OKB Yakovlev: A History of the Design Bureau and its Aircraft. Hinkley, UK: Midland Publishing, 2005. .
 Gunston, Bill. The Osprey Encyclopedia of Russian Aircraft 1875–1995. London: Osprey, 1995. .
 Gunston, Bill and Yefim Gordon. Yakovlev Aircraft since 1924. London, UK: Putnam Aeronautical Books, 1997. .

Low-wing aircraft
1940s Soviet military trainer aircraft
Yak-005
Single-engined tractor aircraft